WLGD (107.7 MHz, "Bigfoot Legends 101.7 & 107.7") is an FM radio station, licensed to Dallas, Pennsylvania, and serving the Scranton - Wilkes-Barre area of Northeastern Pennsylvania. It currently airs a classic country format. WLGD is owned and operated by Seven Mountains Media.

History: Beginnings as WYMK
This station began as WYMK, and was borne out of an effort that began in the mid-1980s with the debut of its AM sister station, WEMR (now WGMM). There was no radio station on the air at that time serving Wyoming County, until a consortium of several local businessmen pooled their resources together to put WEMR on the air. Off to a good, though not overwhelming, start, the new company, known as Endless Mountain Broadcasting, Inc., was inspired to put an FM station on the air, with the help of additional investors to build the new station. One of the owner principals of Endless Mountain Broadcasting was local Chevrolet dealer Don Sherwood, who had also served on the local school board for 23 years. He would go on to serve in the U.S. Congress for eight years prior to the turn of the 21st century.

While WEMR was staffed by a live, local, real-time airstaff, the debate was what to program on the new FM station. Much debate was made among the investors, but they finally settled on Unistar's (now Westwood One) "Adult Rock 'n Roll" classic rock format. On October 10, 1990, the station made its debut as WYMK, "Y-107". Prior to the station going on the air, it had been assigned the call letters WEMR-FM when the license was granted a year earlier, but these call letters would not be used on this station again until 1995, and would remain so until 2002.

In 1997, Endless Mountain Broadcasting put both stations up for sale, with both being purchased by Citadel License, Inc. Shortly after the purchase, the operations for both stations were moved to Wilkes-Barre from their original home at the WEMR transmitter site on Wilmar Drive on the outskirts of Tunkhannock.

The call letters were changed from WEMR-FM in 2002 to WCWY, and then to WBZR two years later, to WGMF in 2006, and then to WGMF-FM in June 2009.

WCIG
The station was most recently branded as "GEM 107.7" and broadcast an Oldies format before being sold to Family Life Ministries. On July 21, 2009, the station started broadcasting the Family Life Network and the call sign was changed to WCIG.

WLGD
WCIG changed their call letters to WLGD on June 15, 2021 and, on June 25, 2021, WLGD dropped the Family Life Network religious format and began stunting with a loop of "Gone Country" by Alan Jackson, meaning that a new format would launch sometime in the following July.

On July 2, 2021 at 10 a.m., WLGD ended stunting and launched a classic country format, branded as "Bigfoot Legends 107.7".

On January 19, 2022, WLGD began simulcasting on WARM 590 AM Scranton.

References

External links

LGD
Radio stations established in 1990
1990 establishments in Pennsylvania
Classic country radio stations in the United States